Three Hearts is an album by rock musician and former Fleetwood Mac guitarist Bob Welch.

Three Hearts may also refer to:

 Radenska Three Hearts, a bottled water brand
 The Three Hearts, a 1939 Polish film
 Three Hearts (film), a 2014 French film
Three Hearts (Alex Clare album), 2014 Alex Clare album

See also

 Four Hearts (disambiguation)
 Three of hearts (disambiguation)
 Two Hearts (disambiguation)